The following lists events that happened in 1977 in Iceland.

Incumbents
President – Kristján Eldjárn
Prime Minister – Geir Hallgrímsson

Events

Births

25 March – Andri Sigþórsson, footballer.
16 May – Emilíana Torrini, singer and songwriter
10 June – Hugi Gudmundsson, composer
20 August – Ívar Ingimarsson, footballer
22 August – Heiðar Helguson, footballer
5 October – Hugleikur Dagsson, artist

Full date missing
Hössi Ólafsson, musician

Deaths

References

 
1970s in Iceland
Iceland
Iceland
Years of the 20th century in Iceland